Saurav Lokesh (born 28 May 1984), also known as Bhajarangi Loki, is an Indian actor who predominantly works in Kannada cinema. He rose to the fame with the 2013 blockbuster Bhajarangi.

Early life
Saurav was born as youngest son to V. Ramakrishna & L. Rajalakshmi in Srinagar Bangalore district, Karnataka. He graduated with a Bachelor of Science degree in Chemistry.  He was employed at HSBC before he resigned and followed his passion for acting and started doing theatre.

Career
Lokesh started his acting journey from theatre in the year 2006.  He has worked with most of the amateur & professional theatre groups from 2006 to 2014, which includes more than 30 plays which has been performed over 100+ shows. While he was doing theatre he managed to get into television serials and started doing supporting roles but did not achieve much success.

Saurav Lokesh made his sandalwood debut in the year 2009 with a small role in the movie Savaari directed by Jacob Verghese. He then appeared in small supporting roles in Huli, AK 56, and Shiva, all directed by Om Prakash Rao, between 2010 and 2012. He appeared as minor antagonists in Googly and Mr. and Mrs. Ramachari.

He has appeared in more than 12 movies in small supporting roles before getting his breakthrough performance in Bhajarangi, directed by A. Harsha, which won him many applause and was praised for his role as Rana. The movie was a commercial hit and got him wide recognition as an actor and he became popular as Bhajarangi Loki.
In the year 2015 he appeared Rathaavara as a transgender, which furthered his fame. He also played a role of a lawyer in Mahakaali. He also appeared as an antagonist in Sharp Shooter. In 2016, he appeared in the movie Jaguar; a bilingual film in both Kannada and Telugu, this was Lokesh's Telugu debut. In the same year, he also appeared as one of the lead antagonists in Jai Maruthi 800. Saurav appeared in the role of Bhujanga in Raj Vishnu.
In Thayige Thakka Maga, Lokesh played an antagonist in the role of Sharath Kale. Later, in 2019, Lokesh played a police officer in the suspense-thriller Striker. In the same year he appeared as Bairaa, an antagonist, in Radhika Kumaraswamy's comeback film Damayanthi, directed by Navarasan.
In 2020, he appeared as an antagonist in rom-com fantasy movie Kaanadante Maayavadanu.

Filmography

Films

Television

Awards and nominations

Notes

References

External links
 
 
 
 

Male actors in Kannada cinema
Indian male film actors
Indian actor-politicians
1984 births
21st-century Indian male actors
Male actors from Bangalore
Living people